Particularly within North American English, gay male speech has been the focus of numerous modern stereotypes, as well as sociolinguistic studies. Scientific research has uncovered phonetically significant features produced by many gay men and demonstrated that listeners accurately guess speakers' sexual orientation at rates greater than chance. Historically, gay male speech characteristics have been highly stigmatized and their usage may be sometimes coded to a limited number of settings outside of the workplace or other public spaces. 

Research does not support the notion that gay speech entirely adopts feminine speech characteristics – rather, that it selectively adopts some of those features. Gay speech characteristics appear to be learned (rather than innate) ways of speaking, like many aspects of language, though their origins and process of adoption by men remain unclear. One particularly relevant feature is sometimes known as the gay lisp, though researchers confirm that it is not technically a lisp. 

There are similarities between gay male speech and the speech of other members within the LGBTQ+ community. Features of lesbian speech have also been confirmed in the 21st century, though they are far less socially noticed than features of gay male speech. Drag queen speech is a further topic of research and, while some drag queens may also identify as gay men, a description of their speech styles may not be so binary (gay versus straight). Like with other marginalized communities, speech codes can be deeply tied to local, intimate communities and/or subcultures.

North American English
Linguists have attempted to isolate exactly what makes gay men's English distinct from that of other demographics since the early 20th century, typically by contrasting it with straight male speech or comparing it to female speech. In older work, speech pathologists often focused on high pitch among men, in its resemblance to women, as a defect. Since the gay community consists of many smaller subcultures, gay male speech does not uniformly fall under a single homogeneous category.

Gay "lisp"
What is sometimes colloquially described as a gay "lisp" is one manner of speech associated with gay speakers of North American English, and perhaps other dialects or languages. It involves a marked pronunciation of sibilant consonants (particularly  and ). Speech scientist Benjamin Munson and his colleagues have argued that this is not a mis-articulated  (and therefore, not technically a lisp) as much as a hyper-articulated . Specifically, gay men are documented as pronouncing  with higher-frequency spectral peaks, an extremely negatively skewed spectrum, and a longer duration than heterosexual men. However, not all gay American men speak with this hyper-articulated  (perhaps fewer than half), and some men who identify as heterosexual also produce this feature.

Vowels
A 2006 study of gay men in the Upper Midwestern American dialect region found that they tend to lower the  vowel (except before a nasal consonant) as well as the  vowel. The study suggests that a California regional sound can be employed or intensified by gay American men for stylistic effect, including to evoke a "fun" or "partier" persona.

Other characteristics
Research shows that gay speech characteristics include many of the same characteristics other speakers use when attempting to speak with special carefulness or clarity, including over-articulating and expanding the vowel spaces in the mouth.

Perception
In terms of perception, the "gay sound" in North American English is popularly presumed to involve the pronunciation of sibilants with noticeable assibilation, sibilation, hissing, or stridency. So even if a speaker does not display all of these patterns, the stereotype of gay speech and the coordination of other non-linguistic factors, e.g. dress, mannerisms, can help form the perception of these accents in speech.

Gay speech is also widely stereotyped as resembling women's speech. However, on the basis of phonetics, Benjamin Munson and his colleagues' research has discovered that gay male speech does not simply or categorically imitate female speech.

In one Canadian study, listeners correctly identified gay speakers in 62% of cases. A Stanford University experiment analyzed the acoustics of eight males (four straight and four gay), who were recorded reading passages, through the perception of listener-subjects and tasked these listeners with categorizing speakers by adjectives corresponding to common U.S. stereotypes of gay men. The listeners were generally able to correctly identify the sexual orientation of the speakers, reflecting the stereotypes. However, there were no statistically significant differences the listeners identified, if they existed at all, based on intonation. These findings are representative of other studies as well.

The study found some correlation between these speech traits and sexual orientation, but also clarified the study's narrow scope on only certain phonetic features.

Other scholars' views

Language and gender scholar Robin Lakoff not only compares gay male with female speech but also claims that gay men deliberately imitate the latter, claiming this to include an increased use of superlatives, inflected intonation, and lisping.  Later linguists have re-evaluated Lakoff's claims and concluded that these characterizations are not consistent for women, instead reflecting stereotypes that may have social meaning and importance but that do not fully capture actual gendered language use.

Linguist David Crystal correlated the use among men of an "effeminate" or "simpering" voice with a widened range of pitch, glissando effects between stressed syllables, greater use of fall-rise and rise-fall tones, vocal breathiness and huskiness, and occasionally more switching to the falsetto register. Still, research has not confirmed any unique intonation or pitch qualities of gay speech. Some such characteristics have been portrayed as mimicking women's speech and judged as derogatory toward or trivializing of women.

Other languages
A study of over 300 Flemish Dutch-speaking Belgian participants, men and women, found a "significantly higher prevalence" of a "lisp"-like feature in gay men than in other demographics. Several studies have also examined and confirmed gay speech characteristics in Puerto Rican Spanish and other dialects of Caribbean Spanish.

See also

 List of fictional gay characters
 Do I Sound Gay?
 Gaydar
 LGBT linguistics
 LGBT stereotypes
 
 Lisp
 Polari
 Swish (slang)

References

Further reading
 Crocker, L., & Munson, B. (2006). Speech Characteristics of Gender-Nonconforming Boys. Oral Presentation given at the Conference on New Ways of Analyzing Variation in Language, Columbus, OH.
 Mack, S., & Munson, B. (2008). Implicit Processing, Social Stereotypes, and the 'Gay Lisp'. Oral presentation given at the annual meeting of the Linguistic Society of America, Chicago, IL.
 
 Munson, B., & Zimmerman, L.J. (2006a). The Perception of Sexual Orientation, Masculinity, and Femininity in Formant-Resynthesized Speech. Oral Presentation given at the Conference on New Ways of Analyzing Variation in Language, Columbus, OH.

External links
 Encyclopedia article on "gay speak"
 Economist article on sounding gay
 Beyond Lisping: Code Switching and Gay Speech Styles

Gay effeminacy
Human voice
LGBT linguistics
Sociolinguistics
Gender-related stereotypes
Stereotypes of men
Stereotypes of LGBT people